Tricia Minelia Flores is a competitive jumper and runner who has represented the University of Belize. She represented Belize internationally at the 2008 Summer Olympics in Beijing.

Personal bests
100 m: 12.13 s (wind: +0.8 m/s) –  San José, 3 June 2005
Long jump: 5.97 m (wind: -2.0 m/s) –  Panama City, 16 April 2010
Triple jump: 12.00 m (wind: +1.4 m/s) –  San José, 9 June 2007

Achievements

References

External links

1979 births
Living people
Belizean female long jumpers
Belizean female sprinters
Olympic athletes of Belize
Athletes (track and field) at the 2008 Summer Olympics
Pan American Games competitors for Belize
Athletes (track and field) at the 2003 Pan American Games
Athletes (track and field) at the 2007 Pan American Games
Athletes (track and field) at the 2011 Pan American Games
Commonwealth Games competitors for Belize
Athletes (track and field) at the 1998 Commonwealth Games
Athletes (track and field) at the 2006 Commonwealth Games
World Athletics Championships athletes for Belize
University of Belize alumni
Central American Games gold medalists for Belize
Central American Games medalists in athletics
Central American Games bronze medalists for Belize